Persicaria punctata (syn. Polygonum punctatum) is a species of flowering plant in the knotweed family known by the common names dotted smartweed and dotted knotweed.

Persicaria punctata is native to the Americas, where it can be found in moist and wet habitat types from Canada to Argentina including the West Indies. It is an extremely variable plant. It may be annual or perennial.

Persicaria punctata grows from a rhizome and produces decumbent or erect stems which may just exceed one meter (40 cm) in length. The branching stems may root at nodes that come in contact with the substrate. The lance-shaped leaves are up to 15 centimeters long and have stipules widened into bristly brown ochrea that wrap around the stems. The inflorescence is a number of branching clusters of dotted greenish flowers with white edges, sometimes tinged pink.

References

External links
Jepson Manual Treatment
Illinois Wildflowers
Calphotos Photo gallery, University of California
photo of herbarium specimen at Missouri Botanical Garden, collected in Costa Rica in 1983

punctata
Flora of South America
Flora of North America
Flora of the Caribbean
Plants described in 1817
Flora without expected TNC conservation status